Goombungee is a rural town and locality in the Toowoomba Region, Queensland, Australia. In the  the locality of Goombungee had a population of 1,026 people.

Geography 
Goombungee is 35 km north-west of Toowoomba in the Darling Downs.

The town is located in the centre of the locality. The main street through the town is the north-south Kingsthorpe Haden Road, which is known with the town as Mocatta Street.

There are three neighbourhoods within Goombungee:

 Kudo around the former Kudo railway station, which was named by the Queensland Railways Department on 12 May 1910 and is an Aboriginal word meaning while ants/termites
 Nara around the former Nara railway station, which was named by the Queensland Railways Department on 12 May 1910 and is an Aboriginal word meaning duck
 Weelu around the former Weelu railway station, which was named by the Queensland Railways Department on 8 June 1912 and is an Aboriginal word meaning stone plover

Road infrastructure
The Pechey-Maclagan Road runs through from east to west, and the Kingsthorpe-Haden Road from south to north.

History

The name Goombungee derives from the parish, which in turn took its name from a pastoral run name named by pastoralist Charles William Pitts in 1854. It is thought be a corruption of an Aboriginal name for area, either goubunga or gonbunga.

The first meeting of the former local government area of Shire of Rosalie was held on 17 February 1879. The town is now part of the Toowoomba Region local government area. Goombungee Post Office opened by 1895 (a receiving office had been open from 1878, first known as Gomoran).

Goombungee Provisional School opened on 1 November 1881. On 3 October 1887 it became Goombungee State School.

In October 1890 St Matthew's Lutheran Church opened with 500 people in attendance.

On Sunday 20 April 1902 St Colman's Catholic Church was opened.

In August 1889 the Queensland Government provided  of land for a cemetery. However, the soil proved too difficult to dig a grave, so another  cemetery reserve was provided on 17 January 1894. The first burial in the new cemetery was Edith Annie Lloyd, aged 10 months, occurring on 23 July 1894. Although intended as a cemetery for Goombungee, its location resulted in it being used by residents of both Goombungee and Haden and the name Goombungee-Haden Cemetery began to be used in 1925. In 2008 the cemetery's private trustees handed over the responsibility for the cemetery to the Toowoomba Regional Council.

The Goombungee Congregational Church was completed in July 1903. As part of the creation of the Uniting Church in Australia, in 1977 it became the Goombungee Uniting Church in conjunction with the East Lynne (Boodua) Methodist congregation. In 1979, the former Greenwood Methodist Church was relocated to the site immediately east of the Congregational Church building and was officially opened as the new Goombungee Uniting Church on 22 April 1979 with the Congregational Church building becoming the church hall. In late 1999 the former Congregational Church building was demolished and the Peranga Uniting Church relocated to its site to be new church hall. On 26 August 2012 the site (with the Greenwood and Peranga buildings) was decommissioned as a church and subsequently sold into private ownership for $185,000. The church was at 6 George Street and the church buildings are still extant (as at 2020).

On Thursday 30 April 1908 St Mark's Anglican Church was opened by Archdeacon Henry Le Fanu.

In December 1920 the Goombungee War Memorial was unveiled by Sir T W Glasgow.

The Assembly of God church was built by volunteer labour on land donated by Stan and Mavis Kajewski. On 25 August 1956 the church was officially opened by Pastor H E Wiggins of Maryborough. When the Assembly of God amalgamated to form the Australian Christian Churches, the church was renamed Goombungee Christian Church.

Goombungee Wesleyan Methodist Church was established in 1981.

In 2003, the town was connected to a mains water supply.

The Goombungee Library opened in 2005.

At the  Goombungee had a population of 1,032.

In the  the locality of Goombungee had a population of 1,026 people.

In 2019 the Anglican parish of Crows Nest (which includes Goombungee) entered in a partnership with St David's Anglican Church in Chelmer, Brisbane, to share their ministry through a combination of services at the various churches combined with online services from St David's. It is an experiment in how the Anglican Church may operate in the future.

Heritage listings

Goombungee has a number of heritage-listed sites, including Goombungee War Memorial at the junction of Mocatta Street and Hartwig Street.

Economy 
There are a number of homesteads in the locality, including Gware Hill.

Education 
Goombungee State School is a government primary (Prep-6) school for boys and girls at 52 Mocatta Street. In 2018, the school had an enrolment of 115 students with 9 teachers (8 full-time equivalent) and 7 non-teaching staff (5 full-time equivalent).

There are no secondary schools. The nearest secondary schools are Crows Nest State School (to Year 10) in Crows Nest to the east, Highfields State Secondary College (to Year 12) in Highfields to the south, and Oakey State High School (to Year 12) in Oakey to the south-west.

Facilities

Goombungee Police Station is at 42 Barker Street.

Goombungee Fire Station and Goombungee SES Facility is at 33-35 Cooke Street.

Goombungee Rural Fire Station is at 4 King Street.

The Goombungee Haden cemetery is in Cemetery Road, which is now just over the boundary into neighbouring Haden.

Amenities

The Goombungee Library is operated by the Toowoomba Regional Council. The library is located at 89 Mocatta Street and is open three days a week (Tuesday, Thursday and Saturday).

The Goombungee branch of the Queensland Country Women's Association meets at the CWA Rest Rooms at 56 Mocatta Street.

The town is served by a number of churches:

 St Matthew's Lutheran Church at 57-63 Mocatta Street

 St Colman's Catholic Church at 5 George Street
 St Mark's Anglican Church at 40-42 King Street
 Goombungee Wesleyan Methodist Church at 10-18 Albert Street, part of the Wesleyan Methodist Church of Australia
 Goombungee Christian Church at 54 Mocatta Street, part of the Australian Christian Churches

The Goombungee Showgrounds are in Lau Street.

There are a number of parks in the area:

 Norm Wockner Park at 22 John Street
 Pioneer Park in King Street
Bottle Tree Park at 70 Moccatta Street
Sports and Recreation Reserve at Mocatta Street (corner Edward Street)
Goombungee Golf Club has an 18-hole golf course on Golf Course Road.

Events 
Each November, Goombungee hosts a Jacaranda Day festival in the main street, celebrating the history of the town and the blooming jacarandas and silky oaks.

The annual Goombungee-Haden Show is held each autumn at the Showgrounds . The Goombungee Rodeo is also held there on the first Saturday in November.

Attractions 
The town boasts a unique ironman at the southern entrance to the town which is reminiscent of the Rural Ironman and Ironwoman competition which was once held annually on Australia Day. There is also a historic museum and an art gallery.

Awards
Goombungee has won four Queensland Tidy Towns awards, in 1975/76, 1976/77, 1980/81 and 1981/82.

References

External links

 
 

Towns in Queensland
Toowoomba Region
Shire of Rosalie
Localities in Queensland